Wedding Rings is a 1929 American Pre-Code drama film directed by William Beaudine and starring H.B. Warner, Lois Wilson and Olive Borden. It is considered a lost film.

Plot
Eve Quinn, a shallow but attractive debutante, makes a practice of leading men on, then coolly casting them aside for new conquests. She openly boasts that she would find pleasure in taking a man from her sister, Cornelia, who is an art student. When Cornelia falls in love with wealthy clubman Lewis Dike, Eve succeeds in vamping and capturing him; broken-hearted when they marry, Cornelia deliberately introduces Eve to Wilfred Meadows, a playboy with whom she begins a flirtation. Dike soon tires of the modernistic furnishings of their home and the jazz-mad parasites who frequent his drawing room, and he is refreshed by visits to Cornelia. When Dike accidentally learns of Eve's liaison with Wilfred, he realizes his error and is reunited with Cornelia.

Cast
 H.B. Warner as Lewis Dike 
 Lois Wilson as Cornelia Quinn 
 Olive Borden as Eve Quinn 
 Hallam Cooley as Wilfred Meadows 
 James Ford as Tim Hazleton 
 Kathlyn Williams as Agatha

References

External links

1929 films
American drama films
American black-and-white films
1929 drama films
1920s English-language films
Films directed by William Beaudine
First National Pictures films
Films based on American novels
Lost American films
Films produced by Robert North
Lost drama films
1929 lost films
1920s American films